Harry Boland (1887–1922) was an Irish republican politician.

Harry Boland may also refer to:

 Harry Boland (trade unionist) (1891–1956), Australian shearer and trade unionist
 Harry Boland (basketball) (1925–2013), Irish basketball player